Kamali Basumatari is a Bodoland People's Front politician from Assam. She was elected in Assam Legislative Assembly election in 2001, 2006, 2011 and 2016 from Panery constituency.

References 

Living people
Bodoland People's Front politicians
People from Darrang district
Assam MLAs 2001–2006
Assam MLAs 2006–2011
Assam MLAs 2011–2016
Assam MLAs 2016–2021
21st-century Indian women politicians
21st-century Indian politicians
Women members of the Assam Legislative Assembly
Year of birth missing (living people)